This is a list of museums in the Gibraltar.

Gibraltar Museum
 Military Heritage Center
Willis' Magazine
Lathbury Barracks
Gibraltar Nature Reserve
Moorish Castle
Great Siege Tunnels
St. Michael's Cave
Pillars of Hercules

See also 
Gibraltar Heritage Trust
History of Gibraltar
Rock of Gibraltar

References 

Gibraltar
Museums
Museums
Gibraltar
Military history of Gibraltar
Barracks in Gibraltar
Museums